The Viale Enrico Forlanini is a long street located in Milan, Lombardy, Italy. It cuts through a park, connecting the city centre with the Linate Airport and the Idroscalo lake. The street is named after Milan-born aviation pioneer Enrico Forlanini (1848–1930). However, it was originally named after Michele Bianchi (1883–1930), a founding member of the National Fascist Party.

References

Streets in Milan